The following is a list of awards and nominations received by Danish director and screenwriter Lars von Trier. Among the many accolades he received over the years, von Trier has won five European Film Awards, a César Award, a Palme d'Or, and has been nominated for an Academy Award and a Golden Globe. In his home country of Denmark, he has won seven Bodil Awards and fifteen Robert Awards.

Organizations

AACTA Awards

Academy Awards

Bodil Awards

César Awards

David di Donatello Awards

European Film Awards

Golden Globe Awards

Gopo Awards

Goya Awards

Independent Spirit Awards

Robert Awards

Satellite Awards

Other awards

Critics awards

Film Festivals

Cannes Film Festival

Other festivals

References

External links
 

Lars von Trier
Lists of awards received by film director